Sri Chand Ram (born 1934) is an Indian hurdler. He competed in the men's 110 metres hurdles at the 1956 Summer Olympics. His personal best was 110H-14.4 in 1960.

References

External links
 

1934 births
Living people
Athletes (track and field) at the 1956 Summer Olympics
Indian male hurdlers
Olympic athletes of India
Place of birth missing (living people)
Recipients of the Arjuna Award